The High-level local government of the Republic of Korea consists of 1 special city, 1 special self-governing city, 6 metropolitan cities, 8 provinces and 1 special self-governing province totaling up-to 17 governing councils. The head of the city is referred as the mayor and that of the province as the governor. These Local government heads are elected by direct popular vote for a four-year term. The head of the local government can also be re-elected for up to three terms. 

Currently the People Power Party holds the 12 local governments out of 17 comprising 7 mayors and 5 governors. The other 5 local governments are headed by the Democratic Party of Korea comprising 1 mayor and 4 governors.

Current office-holders

References

Korea, South